The following is a list of the 189 members of the World Bank:

Member States

Non-member states

The five United Nations member states that are not members of the World Bank are 

 
 
 
 
 

 is not a member of the UN, but is a member of the International Monetary Fund and the World Bank Group, both specialized agencies in the United Nations System.

See also
 World Bank
 World Bank Group
 United Nations Development Group
 United Nations Economic and Social Council

References
 Worldbank.org: "Members"—The World Bank Group @ the World Bank website. Accessed 7-10-2007.

Specific

World Bank members
World Bank members
.List
World Bank Group
Countries by international organization